Luis Luna may refer to:
 Luis Luna (footballer) (born 1988), Ecuadorian footballer
 Luis Luna (Mexican footballer) (born 1920), Mexican footballer and Mexico international
 Luis Luna (poet) (born 1975), Spanish poet
 Luis Alberto Luna Tobar (1923–2017), Ecuadorian bishop
 Luis Luna (sprinter) (born 1983), Venezuelan sprinter and 2004 Olympian
 Luis Eduardo Luna, Colombian anthropologist and ayahuasca researcher